K'Andre Miller (born January 21, 2000) is an American professional ice hockey defenseman for the New York Rangers of the National Hockey League (NHL). He was selected in the first round, 22nd overall, by the Rangers in the 2018 NHL Entry Draft.

Born in Saint Paul, Minnesota, Miller began ice skating at the age of two. He was primarily a forward, modeling his style of play after Mikko Koivu, but switched positions when Minnetonka High School needed another defenseman. He left Minnetonka after two years to join the USA Hockey National Team Development Program, with which he spent two seasons playing in the United States Hockey League and in international tournaments like the 2016 World U-17 Hockey Challenge and the 2018 IIHF World U18 Championships. After his time in the development program, Miller spent two seasons with the Wisconsin Badgers while also appearing in two consecutive IIHF World Junior Championships.

Miller left Wisconsin after two seasons to sign a contract with the Rangers. Due to the COVID-19 pandemic, he did not join the team until the  season. As a rookie playing alongside Jacob Trouba, Miller established himself as a part of the Rangers' young core, consistently seeing over 20 minutes of ice time per game and earning NHL All-Rookie Team honors at the end of the season.

Early life
Miller was born on January 21, 2000, in Saint Paul, Minnesota, He began ice skating at the age of two, and took up ice hockey shortly afterwards. In addition to playing hockey, Miller was a child actor and model for Target and Honda, and he played American football under coach, former Major League Baseball pitcher, and family friend Rick Helling. Originally a forward on his youth hockey teams, Miller's role model was Mikko Koivu, longtime captain for the Minnesota Wild. He only volunteered to switch positions while playing for Minnetonka High School, which needed an extra defenseman.

After registering five goals and 11 assists during his second season with Minnetonka, Miller left his high school to join the USA Hockey National Team Development Program (NTDP). Playing on the team's under-17 squad during the 2016–17 minor ice hockey season, he recorded three goals and 14 assists for 17 points in 54 regular season and tournament games. Additionally, he joined Team USA for 34 United States Hockey League (USHL) games, during which he added an additional seven assists. The following year, he was promoted to the NTDP's under-18 team, with whom he scored nine goals and 29 points in 58 regular season and tournament games. His four goals and 12 assists in 22 USHL games, meanwhile, gave Miller an average of 0.73 points per game, the fifth-highest among USHL defensemen that season.

Playing career

NCAA
Coming off of his stint with the NTDP, Miller was the first Minnesota native taken by a National Hockey League (NHL) team in the 2018 NHL Entry Draft, going in the first round, 22nd overall, to the New York Rangers. Just prior to the draft, the Rangers had sent their 26th and 48th overall picks to the Ottawa Senators to trade up for No. 22. Two years prior to his NHL draft, Miller had already committed to attending the University of Wisconsin to play college ice hockey with the Wisconsin Badgers.

Newly-appointed Wisconsin head coach Tony Granato had voiced a desire to build the Badgers' 2018–19 season around their young defensemen, and Miller was partnered with fellow freshman Ty Emberson. Through his first six games, Miller had seven points and led the National Collegiate Athletic Association (NCAA) with a +9 plus–minus. One of those seven points was the Badgers' first goal of the season, which broke open scoring on a 3–0 win over the Boston College Eagles on October 12, 2018. By Wisconsin's holiday break, Miller led the team with 17 points and had been twice named the Hockey Commissioners' Association National Rookie of the Month, for October and December. Although his season came to a premature end after suffering a leg injury during a February 9 game against the OSU Buckeyes, Miller finished the season with five goals, 22 points, and a +7 rating, and he was a finalist for Big Ten Conference Freshman of the Year. He was also named to the 2019 All-Big Ten All-Freshman Team.

Following his successful freshman campaign, Miller entered the 2019–20 NCAA season as one of only two unanimous selections to the preseason All-Big Ten First Team. He was suspended during the preseason for an unspecified violation of team rules but was able to rejoin the team for their season opener against Boston College. His sophomore season was less successful than the previous year: although he had seven goals, his overall point production was down, with only 18 in 36 regular-season games. Additionally, some defensive struggles pushed his plus–minus down to −7. On March 16, 2020, Miller chose to end his college career after only two seasons by signing an entry-level contract with the Rangers. In 62 NCAA appearances, he had a total of 40 points.

Professional
Miller's contract with the Rangers did not begin until the  season. Normally, he would have joined the Hartford Wolf Pack, the Rangers' American Hockey League affiliate, for the remainder of their 2019–20 season, but by the time he left Wisconsin, the COVID-19 pandemic had already forced the suspension of both the NHL and AHL seasons. These pandemic disruptions left it unclear if Miller, who was already joining an unusually young defensive corps, would begin the 2020–21 season with the Rangers, or if he would need an extra year of development in Hartford.

Although Rangers coach David Quinn had previously announced that Tony DeAngelo would be paired with Jacob Trouba, New York's highest-paid defenseman, Miller impressed enough in training camp that, in addition to making the Rangers' opening-night roster for the 2020–21 season, he was promoted to Trouba's pair. His first NHL point came in his fourth game, an assist in a 4–3 loss against the Pittsburgh Penguins on January 22, 2021. His first goal came four days later, when he pushed one past Linus Ullmark in a 3–2 loss to the Buffalo Sabres. Playing on the second defensive pair with Trouba, Miller quickly became a staple in the Rangers roster, logging over 20 minutes of ice time per game and contributing on both the power play and penalty kill units. Although the Rangers struggled in the NHL's difficult East Division and missed the 2021 Stanley Cup playoffs, Miller, Alexis Lafreniere, and Kaapo Kakko anchored a core of players aged 22 or younger who sportswriters saw as capable of leading the team through future seasons. He finished the season with five goals and 12 points in 53 games while averaging 21 minutes and 7 seconds of ice time per game and was named to the NHL All-Rookie Team for 2021.

Miller began the  season in a sophomore slump, with only one goal, one assist, and a −4 rating through the first 13 games, and he was removed from the penalty kill unit after struggling to stop goals. His first goal of the year came on November 8, when he took the puck from the Rangers' defensive zone all the way across the ice and past Sergei Bobrovsky of the Florida Panthers.

During a game against the Dallas Stars on January 12, 2023, Miller scored the tying goal with only 1 second remaining in the third period. He became the 4th defenseman in Rangers franchise history for the "latest game-tying goals", joining Brian Leetch (1998), Darren Turcotte (1992), and Doug Robinson (1965).

On February 26, 2023, in a game against the Los Angeles Kings, Miller received a match penalty and was ejected from the game late in the first period for spitting in the face of Kings' defenseman Drew Doughty during a scrum. A hearing was subsequently held with the NHL's player safety department and Miller was issued a three-game suspension for unsportsmanlike conduct. Miller later claimed the incident was accidental. Doughty said that there had been no prior interaction between he and Miller prior to the incident and stated following the game, "Whether or not he meant to do it, I have no idea. It's a pretty big loogie on my face, so I was pretty pissed."

International play

Miller's role in the NTDP allowed him to represent the United States at a number of international under-18 ice hockey tournaments, beginning with the 2016 World U-17 Hockey Challenge. He appeared in six games and recorded one assist for Team USA, who finished the tournament in fifth place. Two years later, he appeared with the United States team at the IIHF World U18 Championship, helping take the team to a silver-medal finish with one goal, two assists, and a +4 rating in seven games.

After aging out of under-18 tournaments, Miller represented the United States junior team at back-to-back IIHF World Junior Championships (WJC). At the 2019 tournament, Miller received limited ice time as he attempted to play through an illness that swept through the team, but he had one assist and a +1 rating through six games, and although Team USA lost to Finland 3–2 in the championship match, Miller earned another silver medal. The following year, Miller served as an alternate captain for Team USA and logged the highest number of minutes of any American defenseman, but after losing 1–0 to Finland in the quarterfinals, the United States failed to medal at the WJC for the first time in five years.

Personal life
Miller, who is biracial, has been vocal throughout his NHL career about racism both in ice hockey and more broadly in North America. After the murder of George Floyd, he voiced his support for the Black Lives Matter movement. In March 2020, shortly after he signed with the Rangers, Miller was a victim of Zoombombing during a Rangers video chat, with a hacker interrupting his Q&A to repeatedly make racial slurs using the Zoom chat function. The incident was condemned by the NHL, the Rangers staff, USA Hockey, and several of Miller's New York teammates. In a statement released on Twitter after the Q&A, Miller said that he had been the subject of similar racialized incidents throughout his hockey career and that he chose not to quit the sport out of love for it.

Miller attended the 2018 NHL draft with his mother, former MLB pitcher Rick Helling, and Helling's daughter Jordyn. While playing for the Minnesota Blades, Miller would help coach and put on clinics for the Junior Blades team, which Helling's daughter was a member of. Helling would later coach Miller when he played football at Minnetonka High School. Miller considers Helling a mentor.

Career statistics

Regular season and playoffs

International

Awards and honors

Notes

References

External links
 

2000 births
Living people
20th-century African-American sportspeople
21st-century African-American sportspeople
African-American ice hockey players
American men's ice hockey defensemen
Ice hockey people from Saint Paul, Minnesota
National Hockey League first-round draft picks
New York Rangers draft picks
New York Rangers players
Wisconsin Badgers men's ice hockey players